A Short History of Modern Philosophy: From Descartes to Wittgenstein is a 1982 book by the English philosopher Roger Scruton, in which the author provides a history of modern philosophy. The second revised and enlarged edition was published in 1995.
Scruton examines the thoughts of Descartes, Spinoza, Leibniz, Hobbes, Locke, Berkeley, Hume, Kant, Hegel, Schopenhauer, Kierkegaard, Marx, Nietzsche, Mill, Frege, Husserl, Heidegger and Wittgenstein among others.

Reception
The book has been reviewed in Philosophy in Review, Mind and Studia Leibnitiana.
George Henry Radcliffe Parkinson calls it a "lucid and intelligent guide to the history of modern philosophy."
Anthony Manser points out that Scruton reveals his commitment to analytic tradition and is clearly out of sympathy with philosophers like Heidegger and Sartre. William Day (from Le Moyne College) criticizes the book's "parochialism" and believes that it has a bias towards British thinkers.
The book has also received positive reviews from L. Gordon Graham and Alan Ryan.

References

External links

1982 non-fiction books
1995 non-fiction books
Contemporary philosophical literature
English non-fiction books
English-language books
Works by Roger Scruton
Books about René Descartes
Books about Ludwig Wittgenstein
Works about Martin Heidegger
Works about Jean-Paul Sartre
Works about Edmund Husserl
Books about Georg Wilhelm Friedrich Hegel
Books about Karl Marx
History books about philosophy
Routledge books
Works about Baruch Spinoza
Works about David Hume
Works about Gottfried Wilhelm Leibniz
Books about Søren Kierkegaard
Books about Immanuel Kant